Winds of Fury is a 1993 fantasy novel by American writer Mercedes Lackey, the concluding book of the Mage Winds trilogy. It resolves the story told in the first two books; additionally, it settles several plot threads which originated in the previous trilogy, Arrows of the Queen.

Plot summary
The evil Prince Ancar of Hardorn, while experimenting with magic, accidentally draws the equally evil man-cat Mornelithe Falconsbane from his prison in the Void. Meanwhile, Heralds Elspeth and Skif witness the reunion of Clan k'Leysha, a tribe of Hawkbrothers which was divided because of a magical mishap. The two Heralds, together with Elspeth's lover Darkwind k'Sheyna, Skif's lover Nyara (Falconsbane's estranged daughter), the magical sword Need, the gryphons Treyvan and Hydona, the k'Treva mage Firesong, and the kyree Rris, are leaving for Valdemar, where the non-Heralds will be ambassadors for their various clans.

Firesong's Gate (a magical portal enabling the person to cross large distances in a single step) is co-opted by the ghost of Herald Vanyel, a Herald-Mage who died saving the kingdom. The party find themselves in the Forest of Sorrows near Valdemar's northern border. Vanyel explains that he 'abducted' them because he is about to remove the magical protections around Valdemar. He feels he must warn them because Ancar of Hardorn may take advantage of the lowered defenses and magically attack. Vanyel then makes a Gate to send the party to his ancestral manor near the western border. They head to Haven with all speed, though the gryphons create a minor sensation along the way.

Elspeth discovers that rumors have been circulating that she has been murdered by her stepfather, or that she intends to take the throne from her mother by force. Upon arrival in Haven, she renounces her claim to the monarchy so that she can pursue her new job as the first Herald-Mage since Vanyel. The mages in the group begin finding and training potential mages among the Heralds as quickly as possible.

Ancar, prompted by Falconsbane, launches an attack immediately, using magic-controlled troops. Valdemar responds with an assassination team composed of Elspeth, Skif, Darkwind, Nyara, Need, and Firesong, intending to eliminate Ancar, Falconsbane, and Hulda, an evil witch who tried to corrupt Elspeth in her youth.  Disguised as a traveling show, they move towards the capital.

The situation is complicated somewhat when the assassination team learns that Falconsbane has a secret agent in his head; the evil Adept had found a way to cheat death by arranging to 'take over' the bodies of any member of his bloodline with Adept potential. The victim of the most recent takeover, An'desha, a boy of the Shin'a'in, survived; his personality took refuge in a hidden corner of Falconsbane's mind. Two Avatars of the Shin'a'in Goddess come to him to help him, and he is able to pass information to the assassination party through the Avatars and Need. He slowly becomes aware that it might not be possible to kill Falconsbane without also killing him.

Firesong, Nyara, Skif, and Need lure Falconsbane out of the palace. Need deals the body a mortal wound, causing Falconsbane's spirit to flee into the Void. Firesong pursues him there and destroys him for good. Need is able to heal the damage she has caused and allow An'desha to have his body back. Darkwind, Elspeth, and her Companion attack Ancar and Hulda, who both perish, but Darkwind is injured and Elspeth also kills an envoy from the powerful Eastern Empire, causing it to turn its eye on Valdemar.

With the death of Ancar, Valdemar has little difficulty repelling the Hardornen army. At the close of the book, An'desha and Nyara are healed from the damage Falconsbane had done to their bodies, and the party settles in to live in Haven.

1993 American novels
American fantasy novels
Valdemar Universe
DAW Books books